In Three Persons is the third studio album by Lovelite. Come&Live! Records released the album on June 12, 2012.

Critical reception

Awarding the album four and a half stars at Jesus Freak Hideout, Scott Fryberger wrote, "With fantastic 80s-tinged indie pop and worshipful, passionate and honest lyrics from the Polfers... [yet] It's not without its flaws, but they're not often." Dawn Teresa, giving the album four stars from New Release Today, wrots, "Musically creative and unique, the band has created a lush soundscape on In Three Persons to sing praises to our triune God." Rating the album a nine out of ten for Cross Rhythms, Tony Cummings described "a heart-stirring album". David Bunce, indicating in a four star review by CM Addict, wrote, "While other songs bring a high-energy vibrancy that keeps the album away from stagnant pools of repetition."

Track listing

References

2012 albums